The 1992–93 New Mexico State Aggies basketball team represented New Mexico State University in the 1992–93 college basketball season. This was Neil McCarthy's 8th season as head coach. The Aggies played their home games at Pan American Center and competed in the Big West Conference. They finished the season 26–8, 15–3 in Big West play to win the conference regular season title. They lost in the championship game of the Big West tournament, but received an at-large bid to the NCAA tournament as No. 7 seed in the East region.

In the opening round, New Mexico State defeated No. 10 seed Nebraska, 93–79. The Aggies were then beaten by No. 2 seed Cincinnati in the second round, 85–78.

Roster

Schedule and results

|-
!colspan=9 style=| Regular season

|-
!colspan=9 style=|Big West tournament

|-
!colspan=9 style=|NCAA tournament

Rankings

References

New Mexico State
New Mexico State
New Mexico State Aggies men's basketball seasons
Aggies
Aggies